Powertrack is the brand name for the Matchbox's slot car sets. Introduced in the late 1970s by Lesney Products Ltd, Powertrack models differed from other slot car sets because the cars could be seen in the dark as the cars had headlights. Matchbox's H0/00 (approx. 1:64) cars were smaller than Scalextric 1:32-scale cars. In the United States, the series were renamed "Speedtrack". 

In the UK, Powertrack was a less expensive product than Scalextric and traded heavily on the Matchbox brand. With the smaller size, the layouts could be quite complex yet still fit in the typical 8×4 ft board size. Additionally, it did not sit out of place with H0/00 railway sets and Matchbox's own 75 die-cast range. Peter Kay commented in his autobiography The Sound of Laughter that the Race 'N' Chase set he received for Christmas in the late 1970s was the best Christmas present ever.

With the collapse of Lesney/Matchbox in the early eighties, the last official year of production appears to be 1982. Various attempts to buy the Lesney stock and continue selling the products were tried but subsequently died out. Most notably, Proops Brothers, of Tottenham Court Road, London packaged together sets in plain boxes and sold existing sets with various car combinations. Latterly, several vehicles appear from time to time rebranded as "Counterlane" but these too were short lived.

The sets came with either a 6-volt or an 18-volt power unit. The 18-volt (HVT) cars are extremely quick due to the size and weight and handle well with the aid of a magnet on the underside.

No longer in production, cars and sets can be purchased via eBay with some rarer cars commanding keen prices, like the red Saab 900 Turbo and the gold, yellow livery Ford Escort. Many of the cars for sale come with poor quality tyres, leaving the cars with no grip. The lack of grip results in the cars just wheel spinning without any forward movement. However, there are replacements available, and it is still possible to buy brand new cars in sealed cartons.

Powertrack sets
Powertrack sets came in different sets featuring different cars and track type.

In the UK this consisted of:
Powertrack PT-1000 – Grand Prix (Launched 1978)
Set comprised: 1 x McLaren F1, 1 x Ferrari F1, 8 x 90 degree 9" Curve, 1 x 9" 6V Track Terminal, 1 x 9" Straight, 2 x 6" Straight. 6V 'Grandstand' Battery Box and 2 x Hand Controllers. 8 Crash Barriers, Sticker Sheet & Bridge supports.

This is Powertrack's only UK Battery powered set. The cars do not have headlights. RRP in 1979: £14.99.

Powertrack PT-2000 – Monza (Launched 1978)
Set comprised: 1 x Porsche 911, 1 x Chevrolet Corvette, 8 x 90 degree 9" Curve, 1 x 9" 6V Track Terminal, 1 x 9" Straight, 2 x 6" Straight. 6V Mains Transformer and 2 x Hand Controllers. 8 Crash Barriers, Sticker Sheet & Bridge supports.

One of the most popular sets Powertrack produced with two of the most ubiquitous cars. RRP in 1979: £19.99.

Powertrack PT-3000 – Super Sport (Launched 1978)
Set comprised: 1 x Jaguar XJ Series, 1 x BMW 320i, 9 x 90 degree 9" Curve, 2 x 45 degree 9" Curve, 1 x 9" 6V Track Terminal, 5 x 9" Straight, 2 x 6" Straight. 6V Mains Transformer and 2 x Hand Controllers. 12 Crash Barriers, Sticker Sheets & Bridge supports.

When released, this was a fairly expensive set that was in direct competition with Scalextric. RRP in 1979: £29–99.

Powertrack PT-4000 – Le Mans Set (Launched 1978)
Set comprised: 1 x Porsche 936, 1 x Renault Alpine, 11 x 90 degree 9" Curve, 1 x 9" 6V Track Terminal, 2 x 45 degree 9" Curve, 11 x 9" Straight, 2 x 6" Straight. 6V Mains Transformer and 2 x Hand Controllers. 12 Crash Barriers, Sticker Sheet & Bridge supports.

At the time, the track layouts supplied eclipsed most rivals. RRP in 1979: £39–99.

Powertrack PT-5000 – Indianapolis (28 ft) (Launched 1981)
Set comprised: 1 x Triumph TR7, 1 x BMW 320i, 9 x 90 degree 9" Curve, 1 x 9" 6V Track Terminal, 2 x 45 degree 9" Curve, 13 x 9" Straight, 2 x 6" Straight, 1 x Banked Curve (with supports). 6V Mains Transformer and 2 x Hand Controllers. 12 Crash Barriers, Sticker Sheet & Bridge supports.

This is one of only three sets launched in the UK after the original Powertrack launch of 1978. (The others were Race & Chase & PT-8000). RRP was £34.99.

Powertrack PT-6000 – Race and Chase (American Cop Car) (Launched 1979)
Set comprised: 1 x Police Car, 1 x Corvette Stingray, 6 x 90 degree 9" Curve, 1 x 9" 6V R&C Track Terminal, 1 x Tip Bridge 9", 2 x 9" Straight, 4 x 15" Straight, 6 x Aprons, 4 x LH End Pieces, 2 x RH End Pieces. 6V Mains Transformer and 2 x Hand Controllers. 4 Crash Barriers, Sticker Sheet & Bridge supports.

This was far and away the biggest selling set in the UK; even Scalextric were slow to catch up. UK RRP in 1979: £29–99.

Powertrack PT-6100 – Race and Chase (German Porsche Police Car) (Launched 1979)
Set known as Super Verflogungsjagd in Germany. Set comprised: 1 x Porsche Police Car, 1 x BMW 320i, 6 x 90 degree 9" Curve, 1 x 9" 6V R&C Track Terminal, 2 x Straight 9", 1 x Tip Bridge 9", 2 x Crossovers 15", 2 x 15" Straight, 6 x Aprons, 4 x LH End Pieces, 2 x RH End Pieces. 6V Mains Transformer and 2 x Hand Controllers. 4 Crash Barriers, Sticker Sheet & Bridge supports.

This is the only Powertrack/Speedtrack/Powertrack Plus set released that included 15" Crossover Tracks. This set was not launched in the UK. The box artwork is in German, but this product may have also been distributed widely across Western Europe.

Powertrack PT-8000 – This set featured 4 lane racing (Launched 1981)
Set comprised: 1 x Porsche 911, 1 x Triumph TR7, 1 x Fiat Abarth, 1 x VW Scirocco, 16 x 90 degree 9" Curve, 16 x 45 degree Curve 12", 4 x 45 degree 9" Curve, 2 x 9" 6V 4 Lane Track Terminals, 6 x 9" Straight, 4 x 15" Straight, 4 x 6" Straight, . 6V Mains Transformer and 4 x Hand Controllers. 16 Crash Barriers, Sticker Sheet & Bridge supports.

This Powertrack set still sells well on eBay. Although expensive for a slot racing set, it undercut Scalextric's 4 lane set by nearly £40. This is the only Powertrack set worldwide that employed 12" outer curves to enable 4 lane corners.

The cars listed are those that appear on the box artwork and are generally proven to be sold with the set. However, Matchbox often replaced at least one car depending on immediate stock levels. The blue Porsche 911, dark blue Fiat Abarth, yellow Escort, red Escort and red & White Scirocco are all known to be substitute cars. The car most often replaced appears to be the Gold Scirocco.

UK RRP in 1981: £79.99. This set was also branded as Silverstone 8000. This particular set comprised  4 cars with accompanying controllers the tracks in sections would run parallel to each other.

Powertrack Plus sets

In 1982, Matchbox unveiled Powertrack Plus in the UK. The cars were operated from 12V and were much faster. A magnet on the underside of the 'gearbox' increased grip to the track and the higher voltage was more tolerant of larger track layouts.

Powertrack Plus sets had upgraded transformers, hand controllers and track terminals which featured different connectors that were not compatible with the 6V systems. Curiously, the 12V terminal had no facility for powering the lap counter though. All other track remained the same stock parts but were repacked with Powertrack Plus branding.

A number of new parts were created for Powertrack Plus. A Chicane 'loop the loop' and 'self supporting' banked curve featured in the PP-9000 set, while crossover tracks and a crossover 'flying jump' were included in the PP-3000.

Aside from magnets the cars also had wider pickups on the underside. They also had torquier motors and a different pinion gear and crown wheel. Essentially, every Powertrack Plus car was a revamped Powertrack car body shell with the new Chassis.

The 'Super Boss' and 'Bandag Bandit' were only ever launched in the UK in 12V form.

Powertrack PP-2000
Set comprised: 1 x Jaguar XJ  Series, 1 x BMW 320i, 6 x 90 degree 9" Curve, 1 x 9" 12V Track Terminal, 1 x 9" Straight, 2 x 15" Straight. 12V Mains Transformer and 2 x Hand Controllers. 6 Crash Barriers, Sticker Sheet & Bridge supports.

Introduction to 12V racing. RRP in 1982: £24.99.

Powertrack PP-3000
Set comprised: 1 x Renault Elf, 1 x Porsche 936, 10 x 90 degree 9" Curve, 1 x 9" 12V Track Terminal, 1 x 6" Straight, 1 x 24" Flying Jump, 1 x 9" Crossover. 12V Mains Transformer and 2 x Hand Controllers. 8 Crash Barriers, Sticker Sheet & Bridge supports.

This was the only UK set to include the 9" Crossover track. The black-and-white markings on the Flying Jump and Crossover track were spray painted on and not stickers. RRP in 1982: £34.99.

Powertrack PP-4000
No official details about this set have been uncovered so far. However, it is referenced in the Powertrack Plus Instruction Manual of 1982. This is likely to have been a Race & Chase set with the Police car and most likely the Silver Chevrolet Corvette (in lieu of the Corvette Stingray). The basis for this comes from the Catalogue number assigned to these cars relative to the other Powertrack Plus cars. The track layout may have been based on the US Copter Chase set, introducing both the Cross Road and Turn Off tracks to the UK. Those items were first referenced in the UK at the same time.

There are two versions of the 12V Hand controller. One has a Race & Chase style button to reverse the current direction; the other has no such button.

Powertrack PP-6000

This is better known as Race and Chase 2.

Powertrack PP-9000
Set comprised: 1 x Triumph TR7, 1 x Porsche 911, 8 x 90 degree 9" Curve, 1 x 9" 12V Track Terminal, 4 x Straight 9", 1 x Straight 6", 1 x 15" Loop the Loop, 4 x 45 Degree Bank Curve 9", 4 x Straight 15", 12V Mains Transformer and 2 x Hand Controllers. 8 Crash Barriers, Sticker Sheet & Bridge supports.

This is the only UK set to include the Loop. The Loop was painted red on the exterior and was also a chicane. The Banked Curve supplied with this set was a 'Self Supporting' type made of 4 x 45 degree sections. It did not need the sculptured entry and exit tracks or additional support of PT-208. RRP in 1982: £59.99.

Speedtrack sets

Released in the USA at virtually the same time as Powertrack in UK, amid competition from rival H0/00 sets from AFX & Tyco. All these items were 6 Volt and did not feature the box art work of the European products. They also did not include the vac-formed plastic liner to house all the parts. Instead, parts were bagged and packaged loose in similar size cartons. Different livery and set contents were also available in the Canadian sets. Boxes were in US English and French.

In the US, the following Speedtrack sets were available from 1978:

 Grand Prix 150
 Trenton 150 This set was advertised in the Matchbox 1978 catalogue. The set featured two cars, a battery box and white hand controllers.
 Monza 200 (Set No 14-3621)
 Le Mans 300
 Riverside 500
 International 1000 This set was advertised in the Matchbox 1978 catalogue. The set featured two Pinto cars, a battery box and white hand controllers.
 Hulk Racing
 Spider-Man Race & Chase
 Copter Chase
 Race & Chase

By 1981, the name 'Speedtrack' has been dropped in favour of 'Powertrack'. The following sets had been added for the US that were similar to UK 'Powertrack Plus' sets but lacked the 12V system. Curiously, though cars were provided with slim (6v) pick ups they incorporated the magnets and gearboxes of UK 12V Cars. This 'hybrid' was denoted as a 'Positraction' car and advertised as compatible with other H0/00 slot racing systems, most notably 'AFX' & 'Tyco'.

The cars supplied with these sets were catalogued at the same time as 'Positraction' cars but have all surfaced on eBay. 
 Slipstream Racing 14-36-80

This set consisted of Three Cars racing the cars in the set were Martini Porsche Pacer car, Yellow Jaguar and the Red BMW 3.0CSL Orange Jägermeister Livery.

 Tyrone Malone's Daredevil Race N Chase (13.5 Ft of Track)
 Jump Cross Championship
 Pro 8 Challenge
 World Class Racing

No preproduction photos have been unearthed on eBay. The PP-9000 was launched one year later in the UK and featured an extended version of this layout.

Race 'N' Chase sets

Race and Chase – This set featured a Bandit car and an American police car. In this set the cars could U-turn and jump using a tilting bridge.
Race and Chase 2 – This set featured a Bandit car (Silver Corvette) and an American police car. In this set the cars could U-turn and jump using a tilting bridge. This set differed from the previous race and chase set as this was a PowerTrack Plus PP6600 was 4.2m or 14 ft in length, the track also featured a dead end section.
Race and Chase – This set featured American Racing trucks and featured Tyrone Malone on the box. In this set the cars could U-turn and jump using a tilting bridge. This did not appear until 1981
Copter Chase – This set incorporated both the 'Flat Intersection' and the LH & RH Switch track sections, the only set to do so worldwide. It featured the regular US cop car chasing a Black Chevy van and a Helicopter, which ran along on a conventional chassis disguised as a black plinth. This set may command a premium over every other Powertrack/Powertrack Plus & Speedtrack set.
Spider-Man Race and Chase – This set featured  of track a Spider-Man car and a Black Villain van. Released in 1979, it was one of only two sets to feature the Cross road section.
Hulk's Race – This was a basic set featuring a cardboard city scape and a 6V battery box. It featured the Incredible Hulk's van and Escort vehicles.
Spin out in space – Spin off licensed set; the robots are Voltrons and can be separately assembled to make a larger toy. Track is 12V and Blue.

Powertrack cars

Powertrack Plus cars

Speedtrack cars

Positraction cars

Track Pieces (Powertrack)

Track (Powertrack Plus)

Powertrack crash barrier advertising
Along the side of the track crash barriers were fitted which featured the following company's logos. Most sets featured grey crash barriers however the Indianapolis 500 set featured red ones. Gobots sets featured Yellow Crash Barriers adverts on these barriers were self-promoting PowerPak (instead of Powertrack) Racing and Gobots Space Chase.

 Bosch
 Champion
 Ferodo
 Goodyear
 Castrol GTX
 Jägermeister
 Martini
 Shell
 Texaco
 Porsche
 Philips

PowerTrack accessories and spares

Power supply specification Powertrack
 Part Number 22894 D.C Output 6V 0.7 amps 4.2VA (United Kingdom) – Black

Uk Power packs had no earthing cable and just your standard blue (netural) and brown (live) wires which could be wired to a standard British 3 pronged plug. on the output side the wire that connected to the track was the same type (ends) that the controllers had.

 Part Number PT332 D.C Output 6V 1 amps 6.0VA(United Kingdom) – Red/Orange (Possibly for use on four laned Tracks)
 LC302 D.C Output 10V 0.35 amps 7VA (United Kingdom) - Grey (used with lanechanger sets)

These power supplies had an extra output wire as the tracks had three rails.

Track supports Powertrack
Track supports where included with the sets to allow elevated sections of track thus also enabling cars to pass underneath. These connectors could be place together to make the track as high or low as you so desired, typically these pieces where utilised to make a figure eight circuit.

 Colours available − grey, yellow

Lane Changer

Lanechanger differed from the SpeedTrack or Powertrack sets as the cars did not have a pin holding them to the track. The track itself consisted of three rails which enabled the cars to slide from lane to lane at a press of a button located on the hand controller. Cars could easily co-exist on the same rails, this also allowed chicanes to be placed on the circuit as this would not cause the cars to crash. The cars had two different chassis types either A or B  where as the B type chassis visibly has a different pickup.

Lanechanger Sets
Lane Changer LC 1000 – This set featured cars which could switch lanes at a press of a button on the Controller. (13 ft)
Lane Changer LC 2000 –  of track and 3 Chicanes
Lane Changer LC 4000 – RPS or Speedtrack RPS Turbo 4000 – Us version of Lanechanger featuring black hand controllers with Turbo written on them. The RPS in Lanechanger RPS stands for Rack and Pinion Steering.

Lanechanger Cars

Lane Changer Track and Track accessories

Lanechanger Trackside Advertising
Like Powertrack before the Lane changer sets also featured Crash Barrier Advertising and also unlike PowerTrack Advertising on the chicanes, the advertising reflected the time.

 Dunlop Tyres
 Shell
 Phillips
 Porsche
 Jagermister
 Federo
 Castrol GTX
 Goodyear

Powertrack Worldwide

Powertrack is branded under different names depending on country

Italy – Turbo Sprint
Hong Kong – Laneshifter
USA – Speedtrack
France – Circuit Electrique
Germany – TurboRennen

Trivia
The instructions supplied with the sets featured cartoon like cars examples.

 To represent a car overheating – A cartoon car sweating with its tongue hanging out.

The Porsche Turbo

Matchbox produced a Porsche 911 Turbo for their Powertrack and Speedtrack range at launch. The 911 was (and still is) considered de rigueur for slot racing as it is ubiquitous on racing circuits all over the world.

The first Turbo (Mark 1, below) was loosely modelled on the Group 4 930 type. It had wide front wheel arches and 'whale tail' rear wing. In the UK, this was the Green Kremer Powertrack car which was identical to the US light blue/orange car.

However, despite its popularity it was an inferior moulding and short on 'wow' factor. Curiously, it is the only Powertrack/Speedtrack car to have a front axle with spacer bushes on it. This suggests it was a very early Matchbox prototype that could just about pass for production.

When Lanechanger was launched in 1979 Matchbox produced the 935 'Flat nosed' Porsche and this bodyshell was superior in every way to the Powertrack/Speedtrack offering. Matchbox increased its desirability by incorporating the Martini striping of the Works cars from the mid-Seventies.

Intriguingly, when Powertrack Plus was launched in the UK in 1982, the instruction manual included a range of cars 'facelifted' for the new 12V system. Among these was a 'Mark 1' Porsche bodyshell repainted in red to include the new Kremer/Esso Decals.

However, what Matchbox actually produced was a brand new Porsche bodyshell (Mark 2). This was a different mould to the Mark 1 and altogether a superior product.

Collectors will no doubt be seeking the Mark 1 with Esso/Kremer Decals as photographed in the 1981/2 manual. A rare car indeed...

Pre-production cars
Matchbox spent 1976 and 1977 developing cars for the sets. Matchbox needed a fair amount of money to invest in tooling for these cars but its fair to say the early cars are lacking in some detail. Unearthed in the 1978 Speedtrack Catalogue is this fascinating page detailing the state of production in late '77.

Powertrack pre-production cars

The Renault Alpine and Porsche 936 (shown in opposite places to the text) are fairly advanced and if anything represent a more detailed facsimile of the 'production' cars.

The Porsche Turbo and the Corvette (dubbed 'Supervette') look like pre-production cars, but apart from wheels and liveries remained unchanged throughout their life (See Porsche Turbo, above). The VW Scirocco included at this stage did not surface in the UK until 1979/80.

The police car is a prototype more typical of the 'Street' cars of Tyco/Aurora. It looks far from being resolved and in scale and detail it is clearly a long way from being signed off. Given the launch of Race 'n' Chase in 1978 and the great numbers it sold in both the UK & US this would have been quite a feat.

By 1979 Matchbox were developing additional cars and this brochure packed with the UK Race 'N' Chase included familiar cars. The Red Escort is numbered 1, not 8. The moulding is clearly new and lacking windows. The TR7 is in army green metallic, which was not a production colour. Again, it lacked windows. The Fiat too, numbered 22 and a metallic blue with black detailing. The Police car is in evidence and very much redeveloped from its early prototype. The Stingray is actually a Corvette with Stingray colours, not the new Stingray moulding. Only the little VW is unchanged.

Lanechanger preproduction artwork
In 1978, Matchbox launched the RPS Lanechanger system. The Cars initially available were either the Chevrolet Monza or the Porsche Turbo. The Chevys had Chassis type 'A' and the Porsches had Chassis type B. The difference was in the pick up shoes on the underside of the cars. A cars had 2 parallel pick ups, B cars had an 'Offset' pick up shoe. This was to enable the cars to be powered independently while using the same lane. It was not possible to use 2 Type A cars or 2 type B cars at the same time.

Matchbox eventually decided to include both pick up shoe types with each car. This was probably to extend its limited range of bodies for Lanechanger.

The artwork above shows renderings for the 1978 Speedtrack catalogue. The actual cars were not ready for photography so these renderings sufficed.

In the track photography (see Lanechanger section above), the Porsche was a white Powertrack body with a red LC Porsche wing. Look closely and the body is not even fitted with a chassis! The Monza was replaced with a silver Powertrack Corvette but curiously does have a Lanechanger Chassis fitted to it...

Crossroads – Intersection
The 'Crossroad' section of Powertrack only featured in the Copter chase set for the US market. The track did appear in sufficient quantity in the UK around 1980/1 and appears to be a regular on eBay. The track piece was quite large, consisting effectively of 2 15" track pieces adjacent to each other. Any layout requiring this piece needed a fair amount of room to provide sufficient turn in/run out.

The Powertrack Plus manual of 1981/2 details a Cross road track PP-212 (Above). This piece is a standard 9" section of straight with two female joints halfway along the straight. This piece would have enabled the expansion of small sets with limited space and expanded track layout options. However, it did not arrive on the market. As with the Porsche Turbo, Matchbox seemed keen to redesign existing items rather than design new ones.

The PP-3000 set of 1981 features a 9" section of cross over track, while all other sets and accessories in the UK & US feature 15" cross overs.

Counterlane

Matchbox sold some of its excess stock to a company called Dapol, which rebranded it as "Counterlane Dapol" reboxed cars and sold them on. When Dapol decided to stop selling Counterlane, the remaining stock was sold to Proops who were electrical retailers in London, items were reboxed again in plain white boxes. Below is pictured such a rebranded car, in this instance an unknown Lanechanger car. Sets were also reboxed and sold by counterlane which today are extremely rare.

Lane Shifter 
In around 1984, lane change was re-released by Road Champs, as lane shifter. This had some minor improvements.

LJN (Last Race 'N' Chase release) 
The 'Powertrack plus' was released in the USA as GoBots (Space Chase, by LJN) and Voltron (Spinout in Space, by LJN). The track is the same, except it is blue. The Chassises are the same, except they are marked as PowerPak instead of Powertrack!.

Hybrid Cars
It is possible to place the Matchbox Powertrack Chassis into other shells and in some instances making the cars physically bigger. The table below pictures such examples, however the origin of such cars is yet to be established.

Hobbyist Models

Keen hobbyists have produced alternate shells for existing chassis examples are listed below, the makers of such shells are as yet unknown.

See also
 Slot car racing

References

External links

 Matchbox Powertrack collector site
 Matchbox Lanechanger
 Matchbox on Speedtrack.de 
 Powertrack blog
 Matchbox Speedtrack RPS (archived)

Slot car brands
1970s toys